"Maori Boy" is a song by New Zealand retro Maori group JGeek and the Geeks.

Chart performance
The song debuted on the RIANZ charts at number 38 where it stayed for 3 weeks. It then rose 5 spots to number 33

Music video
The music video for "Maori Boy" was put on to YouTube 5 days prior to its official release on Select Live. It received 50,000 views in that time and Soulja Boy made a tweet about the video. The music video has 2,234,964 views as of March 11, 2022 and shows JGeek and The Geeks "geeking" in Auckland City.

References

2010 songs
JGeek and the Geeks songs